Guraleus tasmanicus is a species of sea snail, a marine gastropod mollusk in the family Mangeliidae.

Description
The length of the shell attains 12 mm, its diameter 5 mm.

(Original description) The shell is fusiform, attenuate at both ends, ivory white, between the lirae tinged with very pale red. The spire is raised and longer than the aperture. The shell contains 7 whorls, convex, angular behind and excavate above. They are elegantly ribbed lengthwise (12–14 in body whorl), transversely regularly lirate. The ribs are angular, smooth, shining. The lirae are broad and flattened. The aperture is narrowly ovate. The outer lip is thin.

Distribution
This marine species is endemic to Australia and can be found off New South Wales, South Australia, Tasmania and Victoria.

References

 Petterd, W. 1879. New species of Tasmanian marine shells. Journal of Conchology 2: 102–105
 Pritchard, G.B. & Gatliff, J.H. 1900. Catalogue of the marine shells of Victoria. Part III. Proceedings of the Royal Society of Victoria 12(2): 170–205 
 May, W.L. 1923. An Illustrated Index of Tasmanian Shells: with 47 plates and 1052 species. Hobart : Government Printer 100 pp.

External links
  Tucker, J.K. 2004 Catalog of recent and fossil turrids (Mollusca: Gastropoda). Zootaxa 682:1–1295.
 
  Hedley, C. 1922. A revision of the Australian Turridae. Records of the Australian Museum 13(6): 213–359, pls 42–56 

tasmanicus
Gastropods described in 1876
Gastropods of Australia